The 1984 United States Senate election in New Jersey was held on November 6, 1984. Incumbent Democrat Bill Bradley defeated Republican nominee Mary V. Mochary with 64.16% of the vote, winning every county in the state. To date, this is the most recent time Hunterdon, Sussex, and Warren counties were won by a Democrat in a statewide election. This was also the last time Morris County voted Democratic in a statewide election until 2020, where Senator Cory Booker won the county in his reelection and Joe Biden won the county in the 2020 presidential race.

Primary elections
Primary elections were held on June 5, 1984.

Democratic primary

Candidates
Bill Bradley, incumbent U.S. Senator
Elliot Greenspan, perennial candidate

Results

Republican primary

Candidates
Mary V. Mochary, Mayor of Montclair
Robert J. Morris, anti-communism activist

Results

General election

Candidates
Bill Bradley, incumbent Senator since 1979 (Democratic)
Jasper C. Gould (Independent)
James T. Hagen (Independent)
Harold F. Leiendecker (Libertarian)
Jules Levin (Socialist Labor)
Mary V. Mochary, mayor of Montclair (Republican)
Priscilla Schenk (Socialist Workers)

Campaign
Mochary was forced to suspend her campaign in October due to her husband's life-threatening illness. She traveled with her husband to Stanford, California for an experimental heart transplant.

Results

References

1984
New Jersey
United States Senate